Dorcus Ajok (born 12 July 1994) is a Ugandan middle-distance runner. She represented her country in the 800 metres at the 2017 World Championships reaching the semifinals. In addition, she won the gold medal in the 1500 metres at the 2015 Summer Universiade.

Background and Education 
Dorcus Ajok was born in Akura sub-county, present day Alebtong District. She is the second of nine children born to Dicken Atworo , a teacher and Margaret Akello, a housewife.

She attended Dokolo Primary School before proceeding to Aloi Secondary School for her O Levels (UCE). She later attended Bright College, Lira for her A Levels thereafter joining Ndejje University.

International competitions

1Disqualified in the semifinals

Personal bests

Outdoor
800 metres – 2:00.79 (Huelva 2017)
1500 metres – 4:16.44 (Kazan 2013)
One mile – 4:43.1 (Kampala 2014)

References

1994 births
Living people
Ugandan female middle-distance runners
World Athletics Championships athletes for Uganda
Athletes (track and field) at the 2018 Commonwealth Games
People from Alebtong District
Universiade medalists in athletics (track and field)
Universiade medalists for Uganda
Competitors at the 2013 Summer Universiade
Medalists at the 2015 Summer Universiade
Medalists at the 2017 Summer Universiade
Medalists at the 2019 Summer Universiade
Commonwealth Games competitors for Uganda
20th-century Ugandan women
21st-century Ugandan women